Guy Overfelt (born 1977 in Baltimore) is a multi-disciplinary post-conceptual artist based in San Francisco and Bolinas, California. He works with various media including sculpture, performance, photography, video and drawing.

Overfelt received a B.F.A from the Maryland Institute College of Art and an M.F.A. from San Francisco Art Institute.

Best known for his burnout works made using a 1977 Pontiac Trans AM as an artist's utensil and subject matter, San Francisco-based Guy Overfelt’s projects are raucous explorations of the American Dream via car culture. His body of work presents a special mix of printmaking, performance and sculpture that investigates the modern industrial complex by expropriating the symbolic brands of automotive corporations.

Guy Overfelt’s work has been exhibited internationally in galleries and museums including the Oakland Museum of California; Guangzhou Triennial, China; St. Mary's University, Halifax, Canada; The Havana Biennial, Cuba; Ronald Feldman Fine Arts, New York; Jack Hanley Gallery, San Francisco, and White Columns, New York City. His work has been acquired by the Berkeley Museum Collection and the JPMorgan Chase Collection, as well as private collections. His work has been reviewed and featured in numerous publications, including the New Yorker, The New York Times, Art Net, Art Papers, Index Magazine, Paper Magazine, Time Out, Kobe Japan, Time Out, New York, Boing Boing, SF Guardian, Surface Magazine, and the San Francisco Chronicle, as well as other publications and catalogs. His work was featured in the documentary film ‘Burning Rubber’ which recently aired on Bravo.

Notable solo exhibitions

Four Real Walls, Four Walls Gallery, SF, CA (1997)
Project Evidence, White Columns, White Room, NY, NY (1997)
SBMA, Bronwyn Keenan Gallery, NY, NY (1998)
Burn-Out Trial, San Francisco Hall of Justice, SF, CA (1998)
The World #54, The Poetry Project, Taser Project, Summer (repro). (1998)
Game Over, Bronwyn Keenan Gallery, NY, NY (1999)
Free Beer, Refusalon Gallery, SF, CA (1999)
Cruzen USA, Jack Hanley Gallery, SF, CA (2000)
Deluxe, Refusalon Gallery, SF, CA (with Tony Labat and Mads Lynnerup) (2000)
Destroy, First Vienna Austrotel Contemporary Art Fair, Vienna, Austria (2000)
Sons of Liberty Tour, Charas/El Bohio, NY, NY (with Sabbra Cadabra / world's greatest Black Sabbath tribute band) (2001)
Bongzilla, Detour 888 Gallery, SF, CA (curated series Prime Time / Tony Labat) (2001)
PowerSlave, eyelevel gallery, Halifax, N.S., Canada (2002)
Nova G.O., Linc Art, SF, CA (with Nils Nova) (2004)
Highway To Hell, Garage Biennale, SF, CA (with Heather Sparks) (2008)
Freebird, Oakland Museum of California, Oakland, CA (2010)
Ever Wash, Ever Gold Gallery, SF, CA (2011)
"ASSED OUT AND THE MINI DRAMAS", Queens Nails Projects, SF, CA (with Andrew McClintock) (2012)

Notable group exhibitions
Basel Art Fair, Kunsthalle, Basel, Switzerland (curator: Daniella Salvioni) (1998)
Achieving Failure: Gym Culture 2000, Thread Waxing Space, NY, NY (curator: Bill Arning) (2000)
Wine, Women and Wheels, White Columns, NY, NY (curator: Paul Ha) (2000)
Action Jackson, Silverstein Gallery, NY, NY (curator: David Hunt) (2001)
Marked, Hunter College, NY, NY (curator: Heidi Zuckerman Jacobson (2001)
American Dream: A Survey, Ronald Feldman Fine Arts, NY, NY (2003)
Performance Anxiety, Berkeley Art Museum and Pacific Film Archive, Berkeley, CA (2004)
Burning Rubber, St. Mary's University, Halifax, Nova Scotia, Canada (2007)
A THIN SLICE, Baer Ridgway Exhibitions, SF, CA (2009)
Warhol Revisited?, De Young Museum + OFF Space, Oakland, CA (2009)
"Radical Light: That Little Red Dot", Artists' Television Access, SF, CA (2011)
(presented by SF Cinemathque and Berkeley Art Museum & Pacific Film Archive) (2011)
Who Dares Wins, Butcher's Daughter Contemporary Art, Detroit, MI (curator: Monica Bowman) (2011)
Spread - Conceptualism Then and Now, SOMArts Gallery, SF, CA (2011)
"Water McBeer", Ever Gold Gallery,  SF, CA (2011)
"I AM CRIME", SOMArts Gallery, SF, CA (2012)

References

External links
Smith, Roberta, Prop Fiction
Guy Overfelt on Artadia.org
Further information from Happenstand

Living people
American conceptual artists
Artists from Baltimore
Artists from California
San Francisco Art Institute alumni
Artists from the San Francisco Bay Area
1977 births
Post-conceptual artists